Lubomír Sršeň (born 26 June 1954) is a Czech weightlifter. He competed in the men's middle heavyweight event at the 1980 Summer Olympics.

References

External links
 

1954 births
Living people
Czech male weightlifters
Olympic weightlifters of Czechoslovakia
Weightlifters at the 1980 Summer Olympics
People from Ústí nad Orlicí
Sportspeople from the Pardubice Region